is a railway station in the city of Ashikaga, Tochigi, Japan, operated by the private railway operator Tobu Railway.

Lines

Station layout

This station has two parallel side platforms, connected to the station building by a footbridge. The same side of each platform (i.e. the side opposite the location of the station building) is used.

Platforms

Adjacent stations

History
Fukui Station opened on 27 August 1907. 

From 17 March 2012, station numbering was introduced on all Tobu lines, with Fukui Station becoming "TI-13".

Passenger statistics
In fiscal 2019, the station was used by an average of 810 passengers daily (boarding passengers only).

Surrounding area
 Fukui Post Office

See also
 List of railway stations in Japan

References

External links

 Fukui Station information  (Tobu) 

Railway stations in Tochigi Prefecture
Tobu Isesaki Line
Stations of Tobu Railway
Railway stations in Japan opened in 1907
Ashikaga, Tochigi